The 2004 African Futsal Championship took place between 9 July – 3 September 2004.  The tournament was won by Egypt who qualified for the 2004 FIFA Futsal World Championship in Chinese Taipei.

First round

(July 09/July 13)

Semi-finals

(Jul 31/Aug 15)

Final

(Aug 27/Sep 03)

External links
Official Site
On RSSSF

2004
Futsal Championship
2004
African Futsal Championship